St Austell Poltair was an electoral division of Cornwall in the United Kingdom which returned one member to sit on Cornwall Council between 2009 and 2021. It was abolished at the 2021 local elections, being succeeded by St Austell Poltair and Mount Charles.

Councillors

Extent
St Austell Poltair represented the north-west of St Austell, including Poltair School and a small part of Boscoppa (which was mostly covered by the Penwithick and Boscoppa division).

The division was nominally abolished during boundary changes at the 2013 election, but this had little effect on the ward. Both before and after the boundary changes in 2013, it covered 174 hectares.

Election results

2017 election

2013 election

2009 election

References

Electoral divisions of Cornwall Council
Poltair, St Austell (electoral division)